The 2018–19 UNC Wilmington Seahawks men's basketball team represented the University of North Carolina at Wilmington during the 2018–19 NCAA Division I men's basketball season. The Seahawks, led by second-year head coach C. B. McGrath, played their home games at the Trask Coliseum as members of the Colonial Athletic Association.

Previous season
The Seahawks finished the 2017–18 season 11–21, 7–11 in CAA play to finish in sixth place. They defeated Hofstra in the quarterfinals of the CAA tournament before losing in the semifinals to Northeastern.

Offseason

Departures

Incoming transfers

 Under NCAA transfer rules, Linssen will have to sit out for the 2018–19 season, and will have three years of remaining eligibility.

2018 recruiting class

2019 recruiting class

Roster

Schedule and results

|-
!colspan=9 style=| Exhibition
|-

|-
!colspan=9 style=| Non-conference regular season
|-

|-
!colspan=9 style=| CAA regular season

|-
!colspan=9 style=| CAA tournament

Source:

References

UNC Wilmington Seahawks men's basketball seasons
UNC Wilmington
UNC Wilmington
UNC Wilmington